The Allende class is a series of anti-submarine frigates used by the Mexican Navy. Allende-class frigates are former United States Navy -ships which were acquired beginning in 1997. They form the Mexican Gulf Fleet of the Mexican Navy. They are used for anti-submarine and offshore patrol duties.

Description
The Allende-class frigates are former United States Navy s. The ships have a complement of 288 including 20 officers.

The frigates are armed with a reduced version of their American layouts. They mount a single FMC /54 caliber Mk 42 dual purpose gun mounted forward. For anti-submarine warfare (ASW), the frigates are equipped with an ASROC Mk 16 octuple launcher with a reload system sited between the superstructure and the 5-inch gun. Two cells were re-configured to fire Harpoon surface-to-surface missiles in American service, but this ability was not transferred to the Mexican Navy. The Allende class also mounts two twin Mk 32  torpedo launchers in fixed tubes for 22 Mk 46 torpedoes. The launchers are sited on the midships structure, angled outward at a 45° angle. Allende retains the Mk 25 launcher for the Sea Sparrow surface-to-air missiles that the vessels mounted in American service.

The class is equipped with fixed Mk 36 SRBOC 6-barreled decoy launchers for infrared and chaff, SLQ-25 Nixie towed torpedo decoys and SLQ-32CV2 electronic support measures. They mount a Mk 68 Mod gunfire control system for the 5-inch guns, a Mk 114 Mod 6 control system for the ASW armament, a Mk 1 target designation and a MMS target acquisition system. For radar, the Allende class have SPS-40 air search and SPS-10 or SPS-67 surface search. The vessels are equipped with SPG-53D/F fire control radar and SRN-15A TACAN. The Allende class have a SQS-26CX bow-mounted sonar capable of active search and attack. The frigates have a helipad located over the stern of the ship and a hangar capable of storing the MBB Bo 105 helicopter that operates off the vessels.

Ships in class

Service history
The first two ships were acquired by the Mexican Navy on 29 January 1997 and underwent refits for Mexican service. Both ships were commissioned on 23 November 1988. The third ship was acquired in 2000 and the fourth in 2001. Mina is based at Manzanillo, the other three at Tampico. Victoria commissioned on 16 March 2000 and Mina on 1 November 2002.

Citations

References 
 
 

 
Frigates of the Mexican Navy
Frigate classes